Robert David Sack (born October 4, 1939) is a senior United States circuit judge of the United States Court of Appeals for the Second Circuit.

Early life and education

Born in Philadelphia, Pennsylvania, Sack was raised in Brooklyn, New York. His father was Eugene Sack, who served as rabbi of Congregation Beth Elohim for 35 years. In 1989 he married his second wife, the lawyer Anne K. Hilker; he had been divorced from his first wife. Sack received a Bachelor of Arts degree from the University of Rochester in 1960 and received his Bachelor of Laws from Columbia Law School in 1963.

Career

He first clerked for Judge Arthur Stephen Lane of the United States District Court for the District of New Jersey. In 1964, he joined Patterson, Belknap & Webb, eventually becoming a partner of the firm. During 1974, he served as Associate Special Counsel and Senior Associate Special Counsel for the House Judiciary Committee's impeachment inquiry into President Richard Nixon. Following his government service, Sack returned to Patterson Belknap. In 1986, he joined the law firm of Gibson, Dunn & Crutcher as a partner. Throughout his career in private practice, Sack specialized in press law and represented numerous United States and foreign-based media companies.

Federal judicial service

Sack was nominated by President Bill Clinton on November 6, 1997, to a seat on the United States Court of Appeals for the Second Circuit vacated by Judge Roger J. Miner. He was confirmed by the United States Senate on June 15, 1998, and received commission on June 16, 1998. He assumed senior status on August 6, 2009.

Other service

Judge Sack was an officer and director of the William F. Kerby and Robert S. Potter Fund, which assisted in funding the legal defense of journalists abroad, and a member of the advisory boards of the Bureau of National Affairs' Media Law Reporter and the ABA Forum Committee's Communications Lawyer.  He is a member of the board of visitors of the Columbia Law School and was a member of the board of trustees of Columbia University Seminars on Media and Society.  He has, since 2001, been an adjunct professor of law at Columbia Law School.  He was Columbia Law School's commencement speaker in 2007.  He was adjunct professor of political science and special guest lecturer at the University of Rochester in 2012 and a distinguished visiting jurist at the University of Chicago Law School in 2013.  He is a member of the American Bar Association, the New York City Bar Association (Chair, Communications Law Committee, 1986–89), and the American Judicature Society.  He is a Fellow of the American Bar Foundation.  Sack is an adviser, American Law Institute's Restatement Third of Torts, Defamation and Privacy, 2019–    ; an adviser to the "Global Media Freedom Initiative's High-Level Panel of Legal Experts" convened at the request of the UK and Canadian governments, 2019–    ; and a member of the editorial board of the Journal of Free Speech Law, 2021–    .

Publications

• Sack on Defamation: Libel, Slander and Related Problems (5th ed. 2017) (updated annually) 
• New York Times Co. v. Sullivan — 50-Year Afterwords, 66 Ala. L. Rev. 273 (2014)
• "Protection of Opinion Under the First Amendment: Reflections on Alfred Hill, 'Defamation and Privacy Under
the First Amendment,'" 100 Colum. L. Rev. 294 (2000) 
• Advertising and Commercial Speech: A First Amendment Guide (1999) (co-author) 
• "Hearing Myself Think: Some Thoughts on Legal Prose," 4 Scribbs Journal of Legal Writing 93 (1993)
• "Reflections on the Wrong Question: Special Constitutional Privilege for the Institutional Press," 7 Hofstra L. Rev. 629 (1979)

Notable opinions

Doe v. Trump Corporation, 6 F.4th 400 (2d Cir. 2021): Sack, writing for the panel, held that defendants Trump Corporation, Donald J. Trump, and members of his family were not entitled to have the district court enforce an arbitration agreement in a suit for unfair business practices and deceptive statements regarding a multi-level marketing company. 

United States v. Ceasar, 10 F.4th 66 (2d Cir. 2021): Sack, writing for the panel, held that a sentence of 46 months' imprisonment for a defendant who pled guilty to providing material support to the Islamic State of Iraq and Syria was shockingly low and thus substantively unreasonable, when the defendant had already exhibited recidivist behavior while awaiting sentencing and faced a Guidelines range of 360 to 600 months' imprisonment. 

Badilla v. Midwest Air Traffic Control Service, Inc., 8 F.4th 105 (2d Cir. 2021): Sack and Lohier, writing for the panel, held that state-law wrongful death claims against an air traffic controller for negligently causing a civilian flight to crash into a mountain near Kabul Afghanistan International Airport were not preempted by the combatant activities exception to the Federal Tort Claims Act, and that factual disputes remained regarding breach of duty of care and proximate cause. 

Chamberlain Estate of Chamberlain v. City of White Plains, 960 F.3d 100 (2d Cir. 2020): Sack and Hall, writing for the panel, reinstated claims for unlawful entry, excessive force, and supervisory liability against officer-defendants who fatally shot a U.S. Marine veteran with mental illness after the officers forced their entry into his apartment. 

United States v. Napout, 963 F.3d 163 (2d Cir. 2020): Sack, writing for the panel, affirmed convictions of two International Federation of Association Football (FIFA) officials for multiple counts of fraud conspiracy, concluding that the convictions rested upon permissible domestic applications of the federal wire fraud statute and rejecting defendants' arguments that the honest services fraud statute is unconstitutionally vague as applied to them. 

In re Bernard L. Madoff Investment Securities LLC, 976 F.3d 184 (2d Cir. 2020): Sack, writing for the panel, held that transfers of fictitious profit from the Madoff Ponzi scheme were not "for value" for purposes of the fraudulent transfer provision of the Bankruptcy Code, so bankruptcy trustee for Bernard L. Madoff Investment Securities LLC was entitled to recover those funds. 

Compania Embotelladora Del Pacifico, S.A. v. Pepsi Cola Company, 976 F.3d 239 (2d Cir. 2020): Sack, writing for the panel, held that an "exclusive bottler appointment" contract between Pepsi Cola and one of its bottlers in Peru contained no clear statement of perpetuity and was thus terminable at will. 

Sleepy's LLC v. Select Comfort Wholsesale Corp., 909 F.3d 519 (2d Cir. 2018): Sack, writing for the panel, held that mattress manufacturer's allegedly defamatory statements to retailer's agents could satisfy the publication element of a slander claim, and that remand was necessary for the district court to consider whether the retailer consented to the utterance of those allegedly slanderous statements. 

Peterson v. Islamic Republic of Iran, 876 F.3d 63 (2d Cir. 2017): Sack, writing for the panel, vacated in part a district court order dismissing claims by judgment creditors against Iran and Iran's Ministry of Intelligence and Security; Sack held that certain of the judgment creditors were not bound by a settlement agreement releasing Iran's central bank from liability, and that the bond proceeds held by a Luxembourg bank on behalf of Iran's central bank were not immune from execution under the Foreign Sovereign Immunities Act.   

Perez v. City of New York, 832 F.3d 120 (2d Cir. 2016): Sack, writing for the panel, held that fact issues precluded summary judgment as to whether donning and doffing activities by urban park rangers were "integral and indispensable," as required to be compensable under the Fair Labor Standards Act.  

In re Arab Bank, PLC Alien Tort Statute Litigation, 808 F.3d 144 (2d Cir. 2015):  Sack, writing for the panel, held that the Alien Tort Statute did not confer original jurisdiction over claims of terrorism victims against bank that allegedly financed and facilitated organizations who committed attacks in Israel, the West Bank, and the Gaza Strip.  

Turley v. ISG Lackawanna, Inc., 774 F.3d 140 (2d Cir. 2014):  Sack, writing for the panel, held that the evidence supported an intentional infliction of emotional distress verdict, where an African-American steelworker was subject to an abusive work environment replete with racial insults, intimidation, and degradation; jury's award of $1.32 million in compensatory damages was proper, although award of $24 million in punitive damages, which was later remitted to $5 million, was excessive. 

Bailey v. Pataki, 708 F.3d 391 (2d Cir. 2013): Sack, writing for the panel, held that the due process right to notice and an adversarial hearing prior to involuntary civil commitment to a psychiatric facility was clearly established, and thus defendants, who included the former Governor of New York and various state officials, were not entitled to qualified immunity.  

Marvel Characters, Inc. v. Kirby, 726 F.3d 119 (2d Cir. 2013):  Sack, writing for the panel, held that children of influential comic book artist Jack Kirby, who produced drawings for Marvel Comics, had no rights to Kirby's works between 1958 and 1963 because those drawings were "works made for hire" within the meaning of the Copyright Act of 1976. 

United States v. Stewart, 686 F.3d 156 (2d Cir. 2012) (Stewart II): Sack, writing for the panel, held that in the resentencing of Lynne Stewart, her First Amendment rights were not abridged when the district court considered her public statements as a basis for quadrupling her original sentence; such use of public statements did not impermissibly chill speech. 

Barclays Capital, Inc. v. Theflyonthewall.com, 650 F.3d 876 (2d Cir. 2011): Sack, writing for the panel, concluded that the tort of hot news misappropriation was preempted by the Copyright Act as applied to the facts of the instant case, which concerned a novel lawsuit by various investment banks, which publish and disseminate equity research reports, against a small Internet-based aggregator of stock tips which sold the investment banks' recommendations to its own clients.

United States v. Stewart, 590 F.3d 93 (2d Cir. 2009) (Stewart I): Sack, writing for a majority of the panel, affirmed the convictions of Lynne Stewart, the former attorney for "Blind Sheik" Omar Abdel-Rahman, on various counts including conspiracy, providing material support to terrorists, and defrauding the U.S. government, arising out of her conduct in knowingly passing information between her client and his supporters in Egypt in violation of government-ordered "special administrative measures".  The panel also vacated her sentence and remanded for re-sentencing in light of Stewart's possible perjury at her trial as well as intervening factual developments in the case.

Arar v. Ashcroft, 585 F.3d 559 (2d Cir. 2009):  Sack, dissenting in part from the majority opinion en banc, wrote that a Bivens remedy should have been available to a dual Canadian-Syrian citizen who was detained by federal officials at John F. Kennedy airport, repeatedly denied access to a lawyer, and subsequently removed to Syria to be interrogated under torture by Syrian authorities for ten months. 

Best Van Lines, Inc. v. Walker, 490 F.3d 239 (2d Cir. 2007): Sack, writing for the panel, held that under New York law, making defamatory statements outside New York about New York citizens did not, without more, provide a basis for jurisdiction, even if the statements were published in a media accessible to New York readers. 

Blanch v. Koons, 467 F.3d 244 (2d Cir. 2006): Sack, writing for the panel, affirmed the district court's decision that artist Jeff Koons was protected by the doctrine of fair use, and therefore not liable for copyright infringement, when he incorporated a photographer's copyrighted photo of a woman's feet and lower legs into a larger collage painting, even though Koons had benefited commercially from the work.

Leebaert v. Harrington, 332 F.3d 134 (2d Cir. 2003): Sack, writing for the panel, decided that a public school's requirement that students attend health-education classes did not violate principles of substantive due process or religious rights of parents who disagreed with the school's curriculum.

Doe v. Department of Public Safety on Behalf of Henry C. Lee, 271 F.3d 38 (2d Cir. 2001): Sack, writing for the panel, held that a Connecticut sex-offender registration law violated the Due Process Clause of the Fourteenth Amendment, under a "stigma plus" theory, by authorizing public dissemination of information about sex offenders on the registry without first offering them an individualized hearing about whether they were likely to be dangerous.

DeStefano v. Emergency Housing Group, Inc., 247 F.3d 397 (2d Cir. 2001): Sack, writing for the panel, decided that a state does not violate the Establishment Clause of the First Amendment by providing public funding to a private facility that also offers Alcoholics Anonymous (AA) sessions, which are religious in nature, so long as the staff does not require clients to attend AA sessions.

McMenemy v. Rochester, N.Y., 241 F.3d 279 (2d Cir. 2001): Sack, writing for the panel, decided that Title VII of the Civil Rights Act of 1964 renders unlawful retaliation by an employer against an employee who opposes any unlawful employment practice involving any employer, not just the employee's own employer, so long as the employee establishes a causal connection between the retaliation and the employee's protected activity.

Commodity Futures Trading Commission v. Vartuli, 228 F.3d 94 (2d Cir. 2000): Sack, writing for the panel, concluded that a seller of an automatic-trading software program that instructs the user when to buy or sell currency futures is a "commodity trading advisor" under the Commodity Exchange Act (CEA), and that the Act, as applied to that seller, did not violate the First Amendment.

Awards and honors

In May 2008, Judge Sack was awarded the Learned Hand Medal for excellence in federal jurisprudence by the Federal Bar Council.

Clerks

Judge Sack has been identified as an "academic feeder judge," because a number of his former clerks have entered legal academia.  His former clerks include:

 Hon. Aaron P. Avila (1999–2000), Judge, Environmental Appeals Board
 Lauren E. Baer (2007–2008), Managing Director, Arena
 Charles L. Barzun (2005–2006), professor of law, University of Virginia School of Law
 Pamela Bookman (2006–2007), professor of law, Fordham University School of Law
 Joshua Block (2005–2006), Senior Staff Attorney, American Civil Liberties Union, LGBT & HIV Project
 Mala Chatterjee (2019–2020), professor of law, Columbia Law School
 Robert M. Chesney (1998–1999), Dean, University of Texas at Austin School of Law
 Jordana Alter Confino (2016–2017), Senior Director of Professionalism & Special Projects, Fordham University School of Law
 Elizabeth (Lisa) Daniels (2019–2020), Assistant U.S. Attorney, U.S. Attorney's Office, Southern District of New York
 James Darrow (2008–2009), Assistant Federal Defender, Federal Defenders of New York, Eastern District of New York
 Meghann E. Donahue (2006–2007), Vice President and Associate General Counsel, Federal Reserve Bank of New York
 Greer Donley (2017–2018), professor of law, University of Pittsburgh School of Law
 Julie B. Ehrlich (2010–2011), Program Advisor and Chief of Staff, The Andrew W. Mellon Foundation
 Elizabeth F. Emens (2002–2003), professor of law, Columbia Law School
 Susanna Felleman (1998–1999), Executive Vice President, HBO and HBO Max
 Stephen E. Frank (2004–2005), Chief of Securities and Financial Fraud Unit, U.S. Attorney's Office, District of Massachusetts
 Jeanne C. Fromer (2003–2004), professor of law, New York University School of Law
 Kate Gilbert (2014–2015), Trial Attorney, Department of Justice, Civil Rights Division
 J. Benton Heath (2013–2014), professor of law, Temple University, Beasley School of Law
 William Hubbard (2003–2004), professor of law, University of Baltimore Law School
 Aziz Huq (2001–2002), professor of law, University of Chicago Law School
 Joel S. Johnson (2016–2017), professor of law, Pepperdine Caruso School of Law
 Brett M. Kaufman (2010–2011), senior staff attorney, ACLU Center for Democracy
 Beong-Soo Kim (1999–2000), senior vice president and general counsel, University of Southern California
 Dan Korobkin (2007–2008), legal director, ACLU of Michigan
 Jason Mazzone (1998–1999), professor of law, University of Illinois College of Law
 Talia Milgrom-Elcott (2003–2004), executive director and co-founder, 100Kin10
 Luke P. Norris (2012–2013), professor of law, University of Richmond School of Law
 Garrett Ordower (2011–2012), general counsel, Mighty
 Daniel Richenthal (2005–2006), Department of Justice, Office of Attorney General
 Shalev G. Roisman (2008–2009), professor of law, University of Arizona, James E. Rogers College of Law
 Clifford Rosky (2002–2003), professor law, University of Utah, S.J. Quinney College of Law
 Scott Ruskay-Kidd (1999–2000), senior attorney for judicial strategy, U.S. Legal Program, Center for Reproductive Rights
 Andres Sawicki (2006–2007), professor of law, University of Miami School of Law
 Jeffrey E. Sandberg (2010–2011), Attorney, Department of Justice, Civil Appellate Section
 David Seligman (2011–2012), executive director, Towards Justice
 Robert D. Sloane (2001–2002), professor of law, Boston University School of Law
 Richard Squire (2001–2002), professor of law, Fordham University School of Law
 Ilan Stein (2018–2019), Assistant U.S. Attorney, U.S. Attorney's Office, Southern District of New York
 Mitzi Steiner (2018–2019), Assistant U.S. Attorney, U.S. Attorney's Office, Southern District of New York
 Emily Stolzenberg (2013–2014), professor of law, Villanova University, Charles Widger School of Law

(This list does not include former clerks at law firms.)

References

External links

1939 births
20th-century American Jews
Columbia Law School alumni
Judges of the United States Court of Appeals for the Second Circuit
Living people
People from Brooklyn
Lawyers from Philadelphia
United States court of appeals judges appointed by Bill Clinton
University of Rochester alumni
Patterson Belknap Webb & Tyler people
20th-century American judges
People associated with Gibson Dunn
21st-century American judges
21st-century American Jews